John O. Read (born July 8, 1941) is an American politician. He is a member of the Mississippi House of Representatives from the 112th District, being first elected in 1992. Read previously served as a councilman and the City of Gautier's mayor. He became a member of the Republican Party in 2003, having previously been a Democrat. Read's current term ends in January 2024.

References

1941 births
Living people
Republican Party members of the Mississippi House of Representatives
21st-century American politicians
People from Bunkie, Louisiana